Petros Kanakoudis (born 16 April 1984) is a Greek former footballer  who played as a left back and sometimes as right back.

Career

After 14 years playing in Greece for PAOK, ILTEX Lykoi, Asteras Tripolis, PAS Giannina, Iraklis, Doxa Drama, Veria, Apollon Smyrnis, Kerkyra and Platanias., Kanakoudis signed a year contract with FC Inter Turku, playing abroad for the first time in his career.

Career statistics

Club

Honours
Asteras Tripolis
 Beta Ethniki: 2006–07
Iraklis
 Macedonia FCA Fourth Division: 2019–20

References

External links
Guardian Football
Onsports.gr profile 

1984 births
Living people
Greek footballers
Greek expatriate footballers
PAOK FC players
Veria F.C. players
Asteras Tripolis F.C. players
PAS Giannina F.C. players
Iraklis Thessaloniki F.C. players
FC Inter Turku players
Doxa Drama F.C. players
Super League Greece players
Veikkausliiga players
Expatriate footballers in Finland
Association football defenders
Footballers from Thessaloniki